WLJA-FM (101.1 FM) is a radio station broadcasting a southern gospel, bluegrass music, and classic country music format. Licensed to Ellijay, Georgia, the station is currently owned by Tri-State Communications, Inc.

History
The station went on the air as WLJA on 93.5 FM on November 20, 1984. On May 14, 1986, the station changed its call sign to the current WLJA-FM.

WLJA moved from 93.5 FM to its present frequency of 101.1 FM on May 5, 2008.

References

External links

Radio stations established in 1984
Southern Gospel radio stations in the United States
LJA-FM